Kairo is a first-person exploration/puzzle game developed and published by British studio Locked Door Puzzle, Richard Perrin's independent studio. Kairo is set in a world of brutalist architecture which the player must explore to solve the puzzles contained within.

Gameplay

Kairo is played from a first-person perspective and has no additional controls beyond the ability to look around and navigate the environment. Interaction comes in the form of pushing objects, standing on switches or the environment reacting to player movement.

Story

There is no dialogue and very little text in the game. The narrative comes entirely through environmental story-telling as the world is filled with clues and hints towards the player's purpose.

Reception

Kairo has received a positive reaction from critics. Eurogamer described the game as "mysterious and elegant and powerfully distinct" and toucharcade said "The world of Kairo is like a playable, explorable tone poem."

Kairo has been selected for exhibition at events including Develop Conference, Notgames Festival, Eurogamer Expo and Penny Arcade Expo.

References

External links
Kairo Homepage

2012 video games
Adventure games
Android (operating system) games
MacOS games
IOS games
Video games developed in the United Kingdom
Windows games
Linux games